Brad R. Lauer (born October 27, 1966) is a Canadian ice hockey coach and former professional ice hockey player. He is currently an associate coach of the Winnipeg Jets of the National Hockey League (NHL). Lauer previously served as the head coach of the Edmonton Oil Kings of the Western Hockey League. Lauer was drafted 34th overall in the 1985 NHL Entry Draft by the New York Islanders and played in the NHL for the Islanders, Chicago Blackhawks, Ottawa Senators, and Pittsburgh Penguins between 1986 and 1996

Career

Playing career
Born and raised in Humboldt, Saskatchewan, Lauer played three seasons with the Regina Pats of the Western Hockey League (WHL). His success in his final two junior seasons caught the eye of the New York Islanders, who drafted him with the 34th selection of the 1985 NHL draft.

Lauer had successful rookie and sophomore seasons before being hindered by injuries but continued to play in the NHL until the completion of the 1995–96 regular season.

He made appearances with the Islanders, Chicago Blackhawks, Ottawa Senators and Pittsburgh Penguins. Lauer was also a part of the Dallas Stars' system where he provided veteran leadership for their International Hockey League (IHL) affiliate, the Utah Grizzlies.

His most successful season of professional hockey was the 1992–93 season with the Indianapolis Ice of the IHL. Lauer notched 50 goals and 41 assists for 91 points in just 62 games played.

He also suited up for the American Hockey League (AHL) Springfield Indians, Capital District Islanders and the IHL Las Vegas Thunder, and Cleveland Lumberjacks. He retired following 2001–02 season after playing one season with the Sheffield Steelers in the EIHL in which he took the role as player-coach and went on to win the Playoff Championship.

Coaching career
Lauer served as the head coach for the Kootenay Ice between 2002–03 and 2006–07.

On July 30, 2007, he was hired by the Nashville Predators to be the assistant coach of their primary developmental affiliate, the AHL's Milwaukee Admirals, staying with the team for both the 2007–08 and 2008–09 AHL seasons.

Brad left Milwaukee to rejoin his Kootenay Ice coaching partner Cory Clouston, who was now the head coach of the Ottawa Senators, as an assistant coach on July 23, 2009. Lauer was the first former Senators' player to serve on the team's coaching staff, but was not offered an extension on his expiring contract on April 9, 2011 after the team finished with the 5th worst record in the NHL that resulted in himself, assistant coach Greg Carvel, and Head Coach Cory Clouston being let go by the team.

That off-season Lauer signed with the Anaheim Ducks to be an assistant coach with their farm team the Syracuse Crunch of the AHL for the 2011-12 season. However, early into that season the Anaheim Ducks fired their entire coaching staff (November 30, 2011) and Lauer was promoted to assistant coach of the Anaheim Ducks replacing Dave Farrish and Mike Foligno. where he was joined by Bruce Boudreau and Bob Woods who themselves had recently been released by the Washington Capitals.

On June 27, 2018, Lauer was named the head coach of the Edmonton Oil Kings of the Western Hockey League. In the 2021-2022 season he won the Ed Chynoweth Cup with the team. 

On July 21, 2022, Lauer was named an associate coach of the Winnipeg Jets of the National Hockey League.

Career statistics

Regular season and playoffs

References

External links
 

1966 births
Living people
Anaheim Ducks coaches
Canadian expatriate ice hockey players in England
Canadian expatriate ice hockey players in the United States
Canadian ice hockey coaches
Canadian ice hockey left wingers
Canadian people of German descent
Capital District Islanders players
Chicago Blackhawks players
Cleveland Lumberjacks players
Ice hockey people from Saskatchewan
Indianapolis Ice players
Las Vegas Thunder players
New York Islanders draft picks
New York Islanders players
Ottawa Senators coaches
Ottawa Senators players
Pittsburgh Penguins players
Regina Pats players
Sheffield Steelers players
Sportspeople from Humboldt, Saskatchewan
Springfield Indians players
Utah Grizzlies (AHL) players
Tampa Bay Lightning coaches
Winnipeg Jets coaches